Ousmane Diallo (born 1968) is a Guinean wrestler. He competed in the men's freestyle 52 kg at the 1988 Summer Olympics. He has been the Minister of Town Planning and Housing since November 4, 2021 in the Mohamed Béavogui government.

References

External links
 

1968 births
Living people
Guinean male sport wrestlers
Olympic wrestlers of Guinea
Wrestlers at the 1988 Summer Olympics
Place of birth missing (living people)